1-Nonadecanol is one of the constituents of supercritical carbon dioxide (SC-) essential oil of freshly collected aerial parts of Heracleum thomsonii (Umbelliferae).

1-Nonadecanol  or nonadecyl alcohol is a saturated fatty alcohol with the CAS number 1454-84-8.

References 

Fatty alcohols
Alkanols
Primary alcohols